Deudorix nicephora is a butterfly in the family Lycaenidae. It is found in the Democratic Republic of the Congo and Angola.

References

Butterflies described in 1924
Deudorigini
Deudorix